The Table Mountain Wilderness is a protected wilderness area in the Monitor Range of Nye County in central section of the state of Nevada. It is the third largest wilderness area in the state. The nearest city is Tonopah, Nevada. The 1860s ghost town of Belmont is nearby.

The Table Mountain Wilderness is a partially forested tableland, or high plateau, which lies at the center of the Monitor Range. There are significant herds of mule deer and elk as well as mountain lions, bobcats, coyotes, beaver, chukar partridge, sage grouse, blue grouse, golden eagles, hawks, and falcons. The deer and elk herds are among the largest in the state. Five fishing streams hold rainbow, brook, brown, and Lahontan cutthroat trout. Aspen trees are very common. Pines, juniper, mountain mahogany, and cottonwood are also found. Horse packing and riding, hiking and backpacking are popular activities. Other trailheads are at Mosquito Creek, Clear Creek, and Green Monster Canyon. A  loop trail follows Cottonwood Creek, which has beaver ponds.

Wilderness areas do not allow motorized or mechanical equipment including bicycles. Although camping and fishing are allowed with proper permit, no roads or buildings are constructed and there is also no logging or mining, in compliance with the 1964 Wilderness Act. Wilderness areas within National Forests and Bureau of Land Management areas also allow hunting in season. The elk herd, which had disappeared from this region, was reintroduced in 1979 and is doing well. In 1999 the second largest bull elk ever taken in the 20th century in North America was taken in this wilderness.

See also
List of largest wilderness areas in the United States
List of wilderness areas in Nevada
List of U.S. Wilderness Areas
Nevada Wilderness Areas
Wilderness Act

References

External links 
 

Humboldt–Toiyabe National Forest
Wilderness areas of Nevada
Protected areas of Nye County, Nevada
Protected areas of the Great Basin
1989 establishments in Nevada
Protected areas established in 1989